Gorgia  Delves, known professionally and performs under the stage moniker of Georgia  State  Line, is an Australian singer and songwriter. Georgia State Line released their debut studio album In Colour in September 2021.

Early life
Gorgia Delves was born and raised in Bendigo, Victoria, and sang in Catholic school choirs by day and performed in the local pub music scene by night. Delves later moved to Melbourne and formed a band.

Career

2016–2017: Career beginnings and Heaven Knowns 
Delves and bandmate Patrick Wilson met while studying music at a university in Melbourne in 2014, forming both a romantic and professional relationship. In 2016, Delves and Wilson recruited an unofficial band to perform her songs.
 
In 2017, Georgia State Line released their debut single "Older Than I Am" which gained a four-star review from Triple j unearthed's Dave Ruby Howe. This was followed by the single "Heaven Knows" and an EP of the same name, which was released in July 2017.

2018–present: In Colour 
Several singles were released between 2018 and 2020. In September 2021, Georgia State Line released their debut studio album In Colour. The album was recorded by James Cecil in the Macedon Ranges and documents Delves' journey. Delves said "These songs really embody what it means to move through the pains and joy of inevitable change." In a 4 out of 5 star review, Cat Woods from NME said "In Colour is a fresh, Australian take on a time-honoured sound that harks back to the blues-and-rootsy Americana of the '50s and '60s."

The album was nominated for Best Country Album at the 2022 ARIA Music Awards.

Discography

Albums

Extended plays

Awards and nominations

ARIA Music Awards
The ARIA Music Awards is an annual awards ceremony that recognises excellence, innovation, and achievement across all genres of Australian music. They commenced in 1987.

! 
|-
| 2022
| In Colour
| ARIA Award for Best Country Album
| 
| 
|-

Music Victoria Awards
The Music Victoria Awards, are an annual awards night celebrating Victorian music. They commenced in 2005.

! 
|-
| 2021
| Georgia State Line
| Best Country Act
| 
|
|-
| 2022
| Georgia State Line
| Best Country Work
| 
| 
|-

External links

References

 
Year of birth missing (living people)
21st-century Australian musicians
Living people
Musicians from Melbourne